The Malatraix is a mountain and ridge of the Swiss Prealps, overlooking Lake Geneva in the canton of Vaud. The Malatraix is part of the range between the Rochers de Naye and the Tour d'Aï, which culminates at the Pointe d'Aveneyre. It belongs to the municipality of Villeneuve.

References

External links
 Malatraix on Hikr

Mountains of the Alps
Mountains of the canton of Vaud
Mountains of Switzerland
One-thousanders of Switzerland